Kristers Zoriks (born 25 May 1998) is a Latvian professional basketball player, who plays the point guard and shooting guard position. He currently plays for VEF Rīga, and also represents the Latvia national team.

References

  

1998 births
Living people
BK VEF Rīga players
Latvian men's basketball players
Point guards
Shooting guards
People from Dobele